Club Deportivo Andratx  / Club Esportiu Andratx   is a football team based in Andratx, Balearic Islands. Founded in 1957, the team plays in Tercera Federación – Group 11.

The club's home ground is Estadi de Sa Plana.

Season to season

1 season in Segunda División RFEF
16 seasons in Tercera División/Tercera Federación

Former players
  José Luis Rondo

References

External links
Official website
CD Andratx on FFIB.es

Football clubs in the Balearic Islands
Sport in Mallorca
Association football clubs established in 1957
1957 establishments in Spain